The canton of Serres is an administrative division in southeastern France. At the French canton reorganisation which came into effect in March 2015, the canton was expanded from 12 to 41 communes (6 of which merged into the new communes Garde-Colombe and Valdoule):
 
Aspremont
Aspres-sur-Buëch
La Bâtie-Montsaléon
La Beaume
Le Bersac
Chabestan
Chanousse
L'Épine
Étoile-Saint-Cyrice
La Faurie
Garde-Colombe
La Haute-Beaume
Méreuil
Montbrand
Montclus
Montjay
Montrond
Moydans
Nossage-et-Bénévent
Orpierre
Oze
La Piarre
Ribeyret
Rosans
Saint-André-de-Rosans
Saint-Auban-d'Oze
Sainte-Colombe
Saint-Julien-en-Beauchêne
Saint-Pierre-d'Argençon
Le Saix
Saléon
Savournon
Serres
Sigottier  
Sorbiers
Trescléoux
Valdoule

Demographics

See also
Cantons of the Hautes-Alpes department 
Communes of France

References

Cantons of Hautes-Alpes